Calblanque Regional Park, Monte de las Cenizas y Peña del Águila is a regional park in the south-east of Spain, and in this country in the autonomous community Región de Murcia. In this region, it is located in the municipalities Cartagena and La Unión. It is part of Sierra Minera, a mountain chain in the Baetic System.

It is one of the best preserved areas in the Mediterranean littoral in spite of human activities and interaccions. The two last facts brings this area a cultural value.

In regards of its geology, there are two kinds of lithology: metamorphic rocks and Quaternary sediments. Overall, there are the most ancient rocks in The Region of Murcia and the most recent ones, which are altered by sundry erosion processes. These phenomenons turn into the existence of beaches, risks, natural arcs, tafoni, etc.

There is a large diversity of ecosystems: forest spots, sandy areas, etc.

Fauna 
There are birds like little egrets, stilts, avocets, kentish plovers, audoin's gulls, peregrine falcons, Eurasian eagle-owls, Bonelli's eagles, badgers, beech martens, also fish like Spanish toothcarps and reptiles like chalcides bedriagai (Bedriaga's skinks), malpolon monspessulanus (Montpellier snakes) and ocellated lizards and finally animals of other Phyli like crinoids.

Flora 
There are plants like cistus heterophyllus (more or less close to hoary rockrose and to goldenheathers), asparagus macrorrhizus (more or less close to blue funnel-lilies), lotus creticus, sea hollies and pallenis maritimae (more or less close to common cudweeds).

Spots and places 

In this list there are the most important places and spots:
 Cala de los Déntoles (also locally known as Cala Dorada)
 Peña del águila (hill)
 Cala Arturo
 Cala del Barco
 Cabezo de la Fuente
 Cabezo del Horno
 Cala Magre
 Negrete Beach
 Las Cañas Beach
 Parreño Beach
 Punta Negra
 Punta Espada

References 

 https://web.archive.org/web/20171112021607/http://www.murcianatural.carm.es/web/guest/calblanque-monte-de-las-cenizas-y-pena-del-aguila3/-/journal_content/56_INSTANCE_D71m/14/110280

External links 
 https://www.borm.es/borm/documento?obj=anu&id=510857
 Calblanque (Cartagena) - Región de Murcia Digital
 Calblanque, Monte de las Cenizas y Peña del Águila - Montañas y Sierras - Región de Murcia Digital
 OISMA - Calblanque, Monte de las Cenizas y Peña del Águila
OISMA - Calblanque, Monte de las Cenizas y Peña del Águila
- Decreto 45/1995 26 de mayo, PORN Calblanque, Monte de las Cenizas y Peña del Águila - Visor Contenidos

Regional parks of Spain
Protected areas of the Region of Murcia